Herbert Cokayne Gibbs, 1st Baron Hunsdon of Hunsdon (14 May 1854 – 22 May 1935), was a British businessman.

Hunsdon was the fourth son of Hucks Gibbs, 1st Baron Aldenham, and Louisa Anne Adams, and was educated at Winchester and Trinity College, Cambridge. He was a partner in the family firm of Antony Gibbs & Sons, and also served as Commissioner and Chairman of the Public Works Loan Board. In 1908, he bought the Hunsdon Manor and the Briggens estate in Hertfordshire, and served as a justice of the peace and as High Sheriff of the county. In 1923, he was raised to the peerage as Baron Hunsdon of Hunsdon, of Briggens in the County of Hertford.

Lord Hunsdon married Anna Maria, daughter of Richard Durant, in 1885. They had three sons and three daughters. Their sixth child, Sir Humphrey Gibbs, was Governor of Southern Rhodesia. Lord Hunsdon died in May 1935, aged 81, and was succeeded in the barony by his eldest son Walter, who in 1939 also succeeded his cousin to the barony of Aldenham. Lady Hunsdon died in 1938.

References

Kidd, Charles, Williamson, David (editors). Debrett's Peerage and Baronetage (1990 edition). New York: St Martin's Press, 1990.

www.thepeerage.com

1854 births
1935 deaths
High Sheriffs of Hertfordshire
Herbert
People from East Hertfordshire District
Barons created by George V
Younger sons of barons
1